Shòu is the Chinese word/character for "longevity".

Use 
Three of the most important goals in life in Chinese traditional thought are the propitious blessings of happiness (fú ), professional success or prosperity (lù ), and longevity (shòu ). These are visually represented by the three "star gods" of the same names (Fú, Lù, Shòu), commonly depicted as three male figurines (each wearing a distinctive garment and holding an object that enables them to be differentiated), or the Chinese ideographs/characters themselves, or various homophones or objects with relevant attributes. Shòu is instantly recognizable. "He holds in his hand a large peach, and attached to his long staff are a gourd and a scroll. The stag and the bat both indicate fu happiness. The peach, gourd, and scroll are symbols of longevity." His most striking characteristic is, however, his large and high forehead, which earned him the title "Longevity Star Old-pate".

The Chinese character shòu is usually found on textiles, furniture, ceramics and jewelry. The ideograph may appear alone or be surrounded by flowers, bats, or other good luck symbols, but will always hold a central position. 

Longevity is commonly recognized as one of the Five Blessings (wǔfú  - longevity, wealth, health, love of virtue, a peaceful death) of Chinese belief that are often depicted in the homophonous rendition of five flying bats because the word for "bat" in Chinese (fú ) sounds like the word for "good fortune" or "happiness" (fú ) or in this case, "blessings". In this arrangement, the shòu ideograph sometimes takes the dominant central position, replacing the fifth bat.

Other symbols in Chinese iconography that represent longevity include pine trees, cranes, spotted deer, special collectors' stones (shòushí ), peaches, and tortoises. These are often depicted in small groupings to emphasize the central, symbolic meaning of the picture (for example, cranes standing amongst pine trees).  

Perhaps the most common Chinese auspicious saying concerning longevity is that found on scrolls in nearly every Chinese calligraphy shop in the world: shòu shān fú hǎi, which can be translated as "May your life be as steadfast as the mountains and your good fortune as limitless as the seas".

Since 2017, the version 10 of the Unicode Standard features a rounded version of the symbol (🉢) in the "Enclosed Ideographic Supplement" block, at code point U+1F262 (ROUNDED SYMBOL FOR SHOU).

In names
As a sign for a resonant cultural concept, the character became a part of many Chinese names (e.g. Palace of Tranquil Longevity in Beijing). The Japanese equivalent is Kotobuki ;  (see Nakajima Kotobuki, Tsukasa Kotobuki). See also Jurōjin (Shou Laoren) and Fukurokuju.

Gallery

See also
 Fu character for prosperity
 Double Happiness (calligraphy), a common calligraphic good-luck design
Fu Lu Shou, deities in Chinese folk religion

References

Further reading 

Chinese words and phrases
Ageing
Life extension
Chinese iconography